"Missunderstanding" is the title of a number-one R&B single by Al B. Sure!. Taken from Sure!'s second album Private Times...and the Whole 9!, it spent a week at number one on the US R&B chart and peaked at number forty-two on the Billboard Hot 100.

See also
R&B number-one hits of 1990 (USA)

References

1990 singles
Al B. Sure! songs
Songs written by Al B. Sure!
1989 songs